"Cold Hearted" is a song by American singer Paula Abdul, released in 1989 from her debut album, Forever Your Girl (1988). It was written and co-produced by Elliot Wolff, and hit number one on the US Billboard Hot 100, becoming the album's third song to top the US chart.

Composition
"Cold Hearted" is written in the key of G minor and follows a tempo of 122 beats per minute. The song follows a chord progression of GmEmaj7Dm7, and Abdul's vocals span one-and-a-half octaves, from F3 to B4.

Chart performance
"Cold Hearted" topped the Billboard Hot 100 chart for one week in September 1989, ending Richard Marx's three-week run at the summit with "Right Here Waiting". "Cold Hearted" ranked sixth in Billboard'''s Year-End Hot 100 of 1989. It spent a total of eight weeks within the Billboard top ten. "Cold Hearted" was the final UK release from Forever Your Girl in 1990.

Critical reception
Paul Lester from Melody Maker wrote, "'Cold Hearted' has been fabulously cluttered up and fleshed out by Chad Jackson, weighed down with details yet buoyed up by a deliciously light, slippery beat. Simply irresistible."	

Music video
The official music video for "Cold Hearted" was directed by David Fincher and spent more than three weeks on top of MTV's video rotation list. The inspiration for the video came from Bob Fosse's choreography of the "Take Off with Us" scene in the movie All That Jazz''. Abdul dances for music executives with a group of semi-nude dancers. Abdul was wearing a black fishnet dress which exposed her belly button and was sporting a German police hat. The dance floor included scaffolding where Abdul and her dancers hang and dance suggestively.

Personnel
Paula Abdul: Vocals
Dann Huff: Guitars
Elliot Wolff: Keyboards, synthesizers, drum programming

Production
Arranged and produced by Elliot Wolff; co-produced by Keith "KC" Cohen
Recorded and mixed by Keith "KC" Cohen

Charts

Weekly charts

Year-end charts

References

1989 songs
1989 singles
Paula Abdul songs
Billboard Hot 100 number-one singles
Cashbox number-one singles
Songs written by Elliot Wolff
Music videos directed by David Fincher
Virgin Records singles